Mohsen Araki is an Iranian scholar, cleric, university lecturer and politician. He is currently a member of the Assembly of Experts and also a member of the Expediency Discernment Council. He is a prominent Iranian scholar and one of the students of the Islamic thinker Mohammad Baqir al-Sadr.

In 2022, during Iranian_protests, he advocated for the death penalty for protestors. He argued those who participate in the protests should be found guilty of “corruption on earth.”

Life
He was born in Najaf, Iraq. He benefited from the Islamic seminary in Najaf and Qom. He speaks fluent Arabic and English and has authored dozens of books in Persian, Arabic, and English. He was the personal representative of Ayatollah Ali Khamenei (the Supreme Leader of Iran) in London and also the Head of the Islamic Centre of England until 2004.

Works
Causality and Freedom (Al-Tawhid, Volume 17, n.2, Spring 2003)

See also

Ayatollah
List of Ayatollahs

References

1956 births
Iranian people of Iraqi descent
Living people
A
Iranian ayatollahs
Iranian Arab Islamic scholars
Members of the Assembly of Experts
Society of Seminary Teachers of Qom members
Twelvers